Madré is a commune in the department of Mayenne in north-western France.

The maternal great grandfather of Saint Thérèse de Lisieux, Louis Macé, was baptised in the village church on 16 March 1778.

See also
Communes of the Mayenne department

References

Communes of Mayenne